Mark Bolas is a researcher exploring perception, agency, and intelligence.  He is a Professor of Interactive Media  in the USC Interactive Media Division, USC School of Cinematic Arts at the University of Southern California, Director of their Interactive Narrative and Immersive Technologies Lab, Director of Mixed Reality Laboratory at USC's Institute for Creative Technologies, and chairman of Fakespace Labs in Mountain View, California. Bolas is currently on leave from USC, working on the Hololens team at Microsoft.

In 1988, Bolas co-founded Fakespace Inc. with Ian McDowall and Eric Lorimer to build instrumentation for research labs to explore virtual reality.  This work resulted in the invention of display and interaction tools used by many VR research and development centers around the world, including the BOOM (Binocular Omni-Orientation Monitor), the Pinch glove, the RAVE, the PUSH, and VLIB software.

Bolas was awarded the IEEE VGTC Virtual Reality Technical Achievement Award for 2005  in recognition for seminal technical achievement in virtual and augmented reality.

References

External links
Mark Bolas Personal/Professional Site

University of Southern California faculty
Virtual reality pioneers
Living people
Year of birth missing (living people)